Necropsobacter rosorum is a Gram-negative bacterium from the genus of Necropsobacter. Necropsobacter rosorum can cause bacteremia in rare cases..

References

External links
Type strain of Necropsobacter rosorum at BacDive -  the Bacterial Diversity Metadatabase

Pasteurellales
Bacteria described in 2011